Altered State may refer to:
 Altered state of consciousness

Music 
 Altered State (band)
 Altered State (Altered State album)
 Altered State (Tesseract album)
 Altered State (Yellowjackets album)
 Altered State (Stu Dent album)
"Altered State", the 12th movement of Mike Oldfield's Tubular Bells II
Altered States of America, a mini CD by Agoraphobic Nosebleed

Other uses
Altered States, a novel by Paddy Chayefsky
Altered States, a 1980 film based on the novel

See also
 Altered level of consciousness